William Lennox may refer to:
William Gordon Lennox (1884–1960), American neurologist
William J. Lennox Jr. (born 1949), American army officer and president of Saint Leo University
Lord William Lennox (1799–1881), British army officer
William M. Lennox (1900–1991), politician from Philadelphia

Characters 
William Lennox (Transformers), a character played by Josh Duhamel in the film Transformers and its sequels
William Lennox, villain in Black video game